Blepharispermum hirtum is a species of tree in the aster family, Asteraceae. It is native to Oman and Yemen. It grows in escarpment woodland habitat, where it is sometimes a dominant species. In some parts of its range it is vulnerable to overexploitation for its wood.

References

Athroismeae
Flora of Oman
Trees of the Arabian Peninsula
Vulnerable plants
Plants described in 1896
Taxonomy articles created by Polbot
Taxa named by Daniel Oliver